Lower Belle is an unincorporated community in Kanawha County, West Virginia, United States. It was also known as Piatt and West Belle.

References 

Unincorporated communities in West Virginia
Unincorporated communities in Kanawha County, West Virginia